The  are descendants of Emperor Seiwa (850-880) of Japan and are a branch of the Ashikaga clan through the Shiba clan (Seiwa Genji) of the Minamoto clan.

History
Ashikaga Ieuji (13th century), son of Ashikaga Yasuuji, was the first to adopt the name Shiba. The Shiba were Shugo (Governors) of Echizen, Owari, and other provinces, and during the Ashikaga shogunate were one of three families (Shiba, Hosokawa and Hatakeyama) from which the Kyoto-kanryo (Prime Minister of the Shōgun) could be chosen. Shiba Masaaki, the descendant of Shiba Takatsune (1305–1367), established himself in Hachisuka, near the Kiso River at the border of Owari and Mino provinces, whence he took the name Hachisuka.

In the 16th century, the Hachisuka clan came to prominence thanks to its head, Hachisuka Koroku. His uncle held Hachisuka Castle and he lived first in Miyaushiro Castle, which was his mother's family home. Koroku served the Oda clan, being instrumental in several of the early victories of Oda Nobunaga. He later went on to serve under Toyotomi Hideyoshi.

His son, Iemasa, received Tokushima Domain as a new landholding from Hideyoshi. From then until the end of the Edo period, the Hachisuka were the lords of Tokushima and Awa province in Shikoku. They would be one of the few clans to retain the same landholding from the start of the Edo period to its conclusion. They also managed to retain a constant income rating of 256,000 koku.

In the late Edo period, the clan came into national focus because of the contemporary head, Hachisuka Narihiro, who was a son of the 11th shogun, Ienari. The clan sided with the Kyoto government during the Boshin War and contributed troops to the fight in the north, as well as to security duties in Edo (Tokyo). The clan faced internal fragmentation a year later, in the form of the Inada Rebellion, and was peacefully dissolved in 1873 with the rest of the nation's han.

After the Meiji Restoration, the Hachisuka became part of the kazoku, Japan's new nobility system.

Ancestors
Emperor Seiwa
Prince Sadazumi
Minamoto no Tsunemoto
Minamoto no Mitsunaka
Minamoto no Yorinobu
Minamoto no Yoriyoshi
Minamoto no Yoshiie
Minamoto no Yoshikuni
Minamoto no Yoshiyasu
Ashikaga Yoshikane
Ashikaga Yoshiuji (1189-1225)
Ashikaga Yasuuji (1216-1270)
Ashikaga Ieuji
Shiba Muneie (b.1250)
Shiba Muneuji
Shiba Takatsune

Heads of the Family
Hachisuka Kagenari (son of Shiba Takatsune)
Masakazu (adopted)
Masataka
Masanaga
Masaaki
Masamori
Masatoshi (d.1553)
Hachisuka Masakatsu
Hachisuka Iemasa
Hachisuka Yoshishige
Hachisuka Tadateru
Hachisuka Mitsutaka
Hachisuka Tsunamichi
Hachisuka Tsunanori
Hachisuka Munekazu
Hachisuka Muneteru
Hachisuka Muneshige
Hachisuka Yoshihiro
Hachisuka Shigeyoshi
Hachisuka Haruaki
Hachisuka Narimasa
Hachisuka Narihiro
Hachisuka Mochiaki
Masaaki (1871-1932)
Masauji Hachisuka
Masako Hachisuka

Notes

References
Harimaya concise history of the Hachisuka clan
Hachisuka lineage and family history
Lineage and domainal data for the Hachisuka and the Tokushima domain

 
Japanese clans
Ashikaga clan